Yun Jun-sik (윤준식, born 9 August 1991) is a South Korean freestyle wrestler. He competed in the men's freestyle 57 kg event at the 2016 Summer Olympics, in which he was eliminated in the round of 16 by Haji Aliyev.

He competed in the 65kg event at the 2022 World Wrestling Championships held in Belgrade, Serbia.

References

External links
 

1991 births
Living people
South Korean male sport wrestlers
Olympic wrestlers of South Korea
Wrestlers at the 2016 Summer Olympics
Asian Games bronze medalists for South Korea
Wrestlers at the 2014 Asian Games
Asian Games medalists in wrestling
Medalists at the 2014 Asian Games
21st-century South Korean people